The name Morakot was used for two tropical cyclones in the Western Pacific Ocean. The name was contributed by Thailand and means "emerald" in Thai.

Tropical Storm Morakot (2003) (T0309, 10W, Juaning) – struck Taiwan and China.
Typhoon Morakot (2009) (T0908, 09W, Kiko) – struck Taiwan and China.

The name Morakot was retired from use the West Pacific basin after the 2009 season and was replaced with the name Atsani.

Pacific typhoon set index articles